Thacholi Othenan  is a 1964 Indian Malayalam-language historical drama film directed by S. S. Rajan and starring Sathyan in the titular role. The film won the National Film Award for Best Feature Film in Malayalam for the year 1964.

Cast 
Sathyan as Thacholi Othenan
P. J. Antony as Kathiroor Gurukkal
Ambika as Kunki
Devaki as Kunhikanni
Adoor Bhasi as Ambu
Kunhandy as Chaappan
Sukumari as Unniyarcha
Kottayam Chellappan as Payyanadan Chindan
Master Prasad as Kunhambadi

Soundtrack 
Music by M. S. Baburaj. The song "Anjanakkannezhuthi" written by P. Bhaskaran and sung by S. Janaki was well received. A writer called the film's verses "evocative".
'Anjanakkannezhuthi' (S. Janaki)
 ‘Appam Venam Ada Venam,' (P. Leela-Santha P. Nair)
 ‘Kanni Nilavathu' (Leela)
‘Kottum Njaan Kettilla' (Leela & chorus)
 ‘Nallola Painkili' (Leela & chorus)
 ‘Naavulla Veenayanu' (K. P. Udayabhanu)
 ‘Ezhimala Kaadukali' (Leela & chorus)

Reception 
In a review of the film for The Hindu in 2012, B. Vijayakumar wrote that the film would be remembered "its excellent music and one of the best films in the popular ‘vadakkan paattu' genre". Sathyan's portrayal of Othenan was one of his landmark performances.

References 

Indian historical drama films
1960s Malayalam-language films
Best Malayalam Feature Film National Film Award winners